Khirbet Subin is a Syrian village located in the Mahardah Subdistrict of the Mahardah District in Hama Governorate. According to the Syria Central Bureau of Statistics (CBS), Khirbet Subin had a population of 310 in the 2004 census.

References 

Populated places in Mahardah District